Gnaeus Arrius Antoninus (born 31) was the maternal grandfather of the Emperor Antoninus Pius.

Life
A member of gens gens Arria, a family of consular rank, Antoninus was also an office holder, having been twice consul: the first time was in 69 with Aulus Marius Celsus as his colleague, and the second in 97 with Gaius Calpurnius Piso as his colleague. Antoninus was also proconsul of Asia in 78/79.

Antoninus was a friend of and correspondent to the senator and historian Pliny the Younger. The Historia Augusta describes him as a "righteous person", who pitied Nerva when he became Emperor in 96. John Grainger notes "he was the senior figure in a potent aristocratic network which centered on Gallia Narbonensis and extended into Spain, whose members included T. Aurelius Fulvus, P. Julius Lupus and M. Annius Verus."

Family 
Antoninus married Boionia Procilla, by whom he had two daughters: Arria Antonina and Arria Fadilla. Fadilla married Titus Aurelius Fulvus, ordinary consul in 89; their only child was Titus Aurelius Fulvus Boionius Arrius Antoninus, who, as Antoninus Pius, became emperor (138-161). Antoninus Pius' father had died when he was young. Following Fulvus's death, Fadilla married Publius Julius Lupus, suffect consul in 98, and bore him two daughters, Julia Fadilla and Arria Lupula.

Antoninus raised his maternal grandson, and when he died Antoninus Pius inherited his money. Through the inheritances of both sides, Antoninus Pius became one of the wealthiest men in Rome.

References

Sources
 Antoninus Pius biography

31 births
Suffect consuls of Imperial Rome
Roman governors of Asia
1st-century Romans
Year of death unknown
Arrii